Agios Ioannis is a village in the Limassol District of Cyprus, located around 30 km north of Limassol.

References

Communities in Limassol District